Robert Edward "Bud" Cramer Jr. (born  August 22, 1947) is an American politician and was a Democratic member of the United States House of Representatives from 1991 to 2009, representing .  On March 13, 2008, Cramer announced he would not seek re-election to a 10th term.

Early life
Cramer was born and raised in Huntsville, Alabama. Known as Bud by his classmates, he earned a Bachelor of Arts in 1969 and a Juris Doctor degree from the University of Alabama School of Law in 1972. After graduating, he joined the Army as a tank officer. He served at Fort Knox, Kentucky, and remained a member of the Army Reserve from 1976 to 1978.

A widower, Cramer has a daughter, Hollan Lanier; two grandsons, Dylan and Mason; and a granddaughter, Patricia. He is a member of the United Methodist Church, and taught Sunday school classes to young people for many years.

Early political career 
In 1973, Cramer was appointed assistant district attorney in Madison County, a position he held until going into private practice in 1975. He remained in private practice until 1980, when he challenged the incumbent Madison County District Attorney and won at age 33. He was district attorney from 1981 to 1990, until Rep. Ronnie Flippo ran unsuccessfully for governor. Cramer ran for the vacant Congressional seat and won. In 1985, he founded the National Children's Advocacy Center, a child-friendly environment for abused children. He was briefly considered for a post in the Bush administration in 2001.

Retirement 
On March 13, 2008, Cramer surprised colleagues by announcing that he would not seek re-election in 2008 and would retire at the end of his term. Alabama State Senator and Democrat Parker Griffith defeated Republican Wayne Parker in the race to succeed Cramer. Griffith would announce on December 22, 2009 that he was switching parties to join the Republican caucus, becoming only the second Republican ever to represent the district.

U.S. House

Elections 
Cramer was handily reelected in 1992.  However, he was nearly defeated in 1994 by Republican businessman Wayne Parker—the closest that a Republican had come to winning one of the few remaining districts (prior to 2010) in the former Confederacy to have never elected a Republican since Reconstruction.  Cramer only held onto his seat by 1,770 votes.  Cramer managed to defeat Parker with less difficulty in 1996 and never faced serious opposition again, winning five more terms by over 70 percent of the vote and running unopposed in 2006.

Tenure 
In the House, Cramer was a tireless supporter of the International Space Station and a leading advocate for spending increases in missile defense, as Huntsville has long been a center for research and development of these two projects, as Redstone Arsenal—located in the district—is home of the United States Army Aviation and Missile Command (AMCOM) and NASA's Marshall Space Flight Center.

A liberal in his early days, he largely supported the Democratic line for his first three terms. The 1994 near-defeat, however, led Cramer to move more to the right in his voting. He often broke with his party on issues such as abortion, gay rights, gun control, taxes, regulation of business, and the environment. Cramer was one of only four Democrats in the House to vote for the tax cut bill of 2003.  However, unlike a few other conservative Democrats, he did not vote in favor of any of the articles of impeachment against President Bill Clinton.

Cramer's voting record placed him near the center of the House; however, he was often cited as unpredictable in his votes. Child protection was a longtime legislative project of Cramer's pursuant to his work with the area prior to his ascent to the House.

Cramer was a long-time member of the Blue Dog Democrats, a coalition of conservative and moderate House Democrats. Because of his largely conservative positions, he was encouraged by fellow Alabama politician Sen. Richard Shelby to make the same switch that he did and register as a Republican. Cramer resisted these efforts, and won reelection easily in his increasingly conservative district despite his party affiliation.

On October 10, 2002, Bud Cramer was among the 81 House Democrats who voted in favor of authorizing the invasion of Iraq. He also voted in favor of some measures favored by the Republican majority, including the continued occupation of Iraq and re-authorization of the Patriot Act. However, Cramer joined fellow Democrats in opposing President Bush's plan to send 21,000 additional troops to Iraq.

Committees
House Committee on Appropriations
 Subcommittee on Defense
 Subcommittee on Transportation, Housing and Urban Development, and Related Agencies
 Subcommittee on Financial Services and General Government
 The Select Intelligence Oversight Panel
Permanent Select Committee on Intelligence
 Subcommittee on Oversight and Investigations (Chairman)
 Subcommittee on Technical & Tactical Intelligence
The Blue Dog Coalition, Co-Founder
The Congressional Missing & Exploited Children's Caucus, Co-Chairman and Co-Founder
The End the Death Tax Caucus, Co-Chairman and Co-Founder
The House Anti-Terrorism Caucus, Co-Chairman and Co-Founder
The Tennessee Valley Authority Caucus, Co-Chairman

Research Resources
Cramer's Congressional Papers are held by Special Collections and Archives at the University of Alabama in Huntsville.

Electoral history

Group ratings (2004)
National Journal
 Economic: 50% Liberal, 49% Conservative
 Social: 48% Liberal, 51% Conservative
 Foreign: 54% Liberal, 45% Conservative
Americans for Democratic Action: 75
American Civil Liberties Union: 25
Chamber of Commerce of the United States: 86
Christian Coalition: 58
American Conservative Union: 50
National Taxpayers Union: 26
League of Conservation Voters: 36

Notes

External links
 
 
 Robert E. (Bud) Cramer Congressional Collection, The University of Alabama in Huntsville Archives and Special Collections

|-

|-

1947 births
Living people
20th-century American politicians
21st-century American politicians
Democratic Party members of the United States House of Representatives from Alabama
District attorneys in Alabama
Lawyers from Huntsville, Alabama
Military personnel from Huntsville, Alabama
Politicians from Huntsville, Alabama
United States Army officers
University of Alabama alumni
American United Methodists
20th-century Methodists
21st-century Methodists
Members of Congress who became lobbyists